Oblique (in Hungarian: Ferde) is a collage by Hungarian artist Victor Vasarely from 1966 to 1974.

Description
Its dimensions are 78 x 77 centimeters.   
The picture is part of the collection of the Museum of Fine Arts in Budapest, Hungary.

Analysis
The Op art work is a grid of squares arranged with strong diagonals. Some trimming of the shapes adds to the vibrant effect.

References

Collage